Ale Hundred, or Ale härad, was a hundred of Västergötland in Sweden.

See also
Ale Municipality

Hundreds of Västergötland